The 27th Satellite Awards is an award ceremony honoring the year's outstanding performers, films and television shows, presented by the International Press Academy.

The nominations were announced on December 8, 2022. The winners were announced on March 3, 2023. The awards presentation took place at The Beverly Hills Hotel.

Top Gun: Maverick led the film nominations with ten, followed by Babylon, Elvis and The Fabelmans with nine each. Better Call Sauls sixth and final season, and The Righteous Gemstones led the television nominations with four apiece. Six of the special achievement award recipients were announced on January 13, 2023; however, the Mary Pickford Award recipient was announced on February 22, 2023.

Special achievement awards
Auteur Award (for singular vision and unique artistic control over the elements of production) – Martin McDonagh

Honorary Satellite Award – RRR

Humanitarian Award (for making a difference in the lives of those in the artistic community and beyond) – Joe Mantegna

Mary Pickford Award (for outstanding artistic contribution to the entertainment industry) – Diane Warren

Nikola Tesla Award (for visionary achievement in filmmaking technology) – Ryan Tudhope

Breakthrough Performance Award – Bhavin Rabari (Last Film Show)

Stunt Performance Award – Casey O'Neill (Top Gun: Maverick)

Ensemble: Motion Picture – Glass Onion: A Knives Out Mystery

Ensemble: Television – Winning Time: The Rise of the Lakers Dynasty

Motion picture winners and nominees

Winners are listed first and highlighted in bold.

Films with multiple nominations

Films with multiple wins

Television winners and nominees

Winners are listed first and highlighted in bold.

Series with multiple nominations

Series with multiple wins

References

External links
 International Press Academy website

Satellite Awards ceremonies
2022 film awards
2023 in California
2022 television awards
March 2023 events in the United States